"The Key the Secret" is the debut single by British group Urban Cookie Collective, released in June 1993 from their debut album, High on a Happy Vibe (1994). It features vocals by British singer Diane Charlemagne. The song peaked at number one in the Netherlands and was a top 5 hit also in Australia, Belgium, Germany, Ireland, and the UK, where it reached number two.

Today, the song is widely regarded as one of the biggest dance music anthems of the '90s and has been remixed several times. A remix of the song was also included in episode 2 of the second series of Channel 4's drama series Queer as Folk in 2000. "The Key, The Secret" was more recently covered by Phobos & Deimos. And German pop singer Jasmin Wagner, better known as Blümchen, heavily sampled the chorus and the beat of the song in the German version as "Er ist so süß" in 2000, which was released on her fourth studio album, Die Welt gehört Dir.

Background and release
"The Key the Secret" was originally a track written at home by Rohan Heath in a soul and hip hop vein. It was released on the tiny Unheard Records label. After a subsequent re-mix provoked a massive club response it was picked up by the Pulse 8 record label and released on 28 June 1993.

Chart performance

In Europe, "The Key the Secret" peaked at number one in the Netherlands and entered the top 10 in Austria, Belgium, Germany, Ireland, Switzerland, and the United Kingdom, as well as on the Eurochart Hot 100, where it reached number 10. It also peaked at number eight on the European Dance Radio Chart. In the UK, "The Key the Secret" peaked in its sixth week on the UK Singles Chart, on 8 August 1993; it spent two weeks as number two and 16 consecutive weeks inside the UK top 75. It was also a top 20 hit in Finland, Italy, and Spain. Outside Europe, the single reached number three on Canada's RPM Dance/Urban chart, number four in Australia, number 10 in Zimbabwe, number 26 on the US Billboard Hot Dance Club Play chart, and number 31 in New Zealand.

In 1996, the track was remixed and again entered the UK charts peaking for one week at number 52. It was remixed again in 2004, this time peaking at number 31 in 2005. An uptempo Eurodance remix was also made by DJ Dougal and Mickey Skeedale for Dancemania Speed in 1998.

Critical reception
British DJ Graham Gold picked "The Key the Secret" as one of his favourites in 1995, saying, "I don't care who dissed it – or if it crossed over into the charts. The vocal was so up and positive it made me feel how music should make you feel – good." James Masterton viewed it as "a rather weak-kneed piece of girlie dance" in his weekly UK chart commentary. Andy Beevers from Music Week rated it three out of five, describing it as a "poppy house tune with catchy female vocals". Upon the release of the 1996 remix, a reviewer of the magazine gave it four out of five, commenting, "A seemingly superfluous reissue remix of the 1993 number two hit. Nevertheless, the song maintains its effervescent hook of housey piano and celebratory vocal, and could well be a hit again." James Hamilton from the RM Dance Update declared it as a "Charlemagne cooed raving galloper". Mark Frith from Smash Hits complimented it as a "corking" single in his review of the High on a Happy Vibe album.

Australian music channel Max included "The Key the Secret" in their list of "1000 Greatest Songs of All Time" in 2012.

Music video
The accompanying music video of "The Key the Secret" was directed by British director and assistant director Lindy Heymann. It features the band performing the song in an indoor botanical garden. Singer Diane Charlemagne sings between the plants. Several dancers also appear in the video, with body painting in gold. The colours of the video repeatedly fade out into black-and-white or the opposite. Some scenes also show the dancers looking into or they are seen through a glass sphere. "The Key the Secret" received heavy rotation on MTV Europe in November 1993.

Track listing

 7-inch single, Belgium (1993)   
"The Key the Secret" (Glamourously Developed Edit) – 3:41
"The Key the Secret" (Kamoflage Club Edit) – 4:24

 12-inch single, UK (1993)  
"The Key the Secret" (Glamourously Developed Mix) – 6:16
"The Key the Secret" (Regressive Mix) – 6:01
"The Key the Secret" (Kamoflage Club Mix) – 6:40
"The Key the Secret" (Kamoflage Dub) – 7:30                

 CD single, UK (1993)   
"The Key the Secret" (Glamourously Developed Edit) – 3:40
"The Key the Secret" (Glamourously Developed Mix) – 6:16
"The Key the Secret" (Regressive Mix) – 6:01
"The Key the Secret" (Kamoflage Club Mix) – 6:40                
"The Key the Secret" (Hungarian Deli Mix) – 5:16
"The Key the Secret" (Shute The Flute Mix) – 5:45

 CD single, Scandinavia (1993)   
"The Key the Secret" (Glamourously Developed Edit) – 3:42
"The Key the Secret" (Glamorously Developed Mix) – 6:16

Charts

Weekly charts

Year-end charts

Certifications

References

1993 songs
1993 debut singles
1996 singles
2004 singles
Dutch Top 40 number-one singles
Music Week number-one dance singles
Music videos directed by Lindy Heymann
Pulse 8 singles
Urban Cookie Collective songs